Tsuchiya (written: 土屋 or 土谷) is a Japanese surname. Notable people with the surname include:

, Japanese-American singer, actress and model
, better known as Shark Tsuchiya, Japanese professional wrestler
, Japanese manga artist
Haruhiko Tsuchiya, Japanese engineer
, Japanese racing driver
, Japanese baseball player
, Japanese singer-songwriter and musician
, Japanese daimyō
, Japanese politician
, Japanese samurai
, Japanese general
, Japanese artist
, Japanese speed skater
, Japanese politician
, Japanese actress, model and dancer
, Japanese baseball player
Tilsa Tsuchiya (1928–1984), Peruvian artist
, Japanese film director
, Japanese television producer and planning director 
Tom Tsuchiya (born 1972), American sculptor
Toyo Tsuchiya, Japanese artist and photographer 
, Japanese actor
, Japanese actor 
, Japanese footballer
, Japanese filmmaker

See also
Tsuchiya clan

Japanese-language surnames